José Selgas y Carrasco (born in Lorca, Murcia on November 27, 1822; dead in Madrid on February 5, 1882) was a Spanish poet, novelist and journalist.

Life

He received his early training at the Seminary of San Fulgencio; his family being in economically strained circumstances, he was obliged to cut short his studies in order to contribute to its support. Going to Madrid, he there occupied minor Government positions, and engaged in journalism.

As a staunch Conservative, he assailed the Liberals in the articles which he wrote for the periodical El Padre Cobos and other newspapers. He acted as secretary for Martinez Campos when the latter was Prime Minister. The Spanish Academy made him one of its members.

Works

Selgas belongs among the minor writers. His repute depends upon his lyrics and his short tales rather than upon his more ambitious novels. The best of his verse, which is generally marked by a gentle melancholy, will be found in the two collections, "La Primavera" and "El Estio", both put forth in 1850. After his death there appeared the volume of poems entitled "Flores y Espinas". Of his longer novels there may be mentioned the "Dos Rivales" and "Una Madre", both rather tedious compositions. In his short tales he is most successful when he indulges in the sentimental; he is less attractive when he gives utterance to his pessimistic feeling. At times his sentimentalism and pessimism become even morbid.

A number of his journalistic articles have been brought together in several of the volumes of his collected works, as "Hojas sueltas", "Estudios sociales", etc. They illustrate his ultra-Conservativism in politics.

References

Obras completas, ed. Dubrull (15 vols., Madrid, 1887); 
Garcia, La Literatura espanola en el siglo XIX, pt. I, ii.

External links
Catholic Encyclopedia article
 
 
 

1822 births
1882 deaths
Murcian writers
People from Lorca, Spain
Spanish male novelists
Spanish male poets
19th-century Spanish poets
19th-century Spanish novelists
19th-century male writers